J. R. Patton (born September 12, 1983) is an American professional stock car racing driver. He has competed in NASCAR competition in the Featherlite Southwest Tour and the Craftsman Truck Series.

Career
Educated at New Mexico State University, where he majored in business marketing, and a member of the Zia people, Patton won the Rookie of the Year award in 2003 in the NASCAR Featherlite Southwest Tour.

Patton made seven starts late in the 2004 NASCAR Craftsman Truck Series season for Fiddleback Racing.  In his debut, Patton ran a second Fiddleback truck, the No. 66, to a fifteenth-place finish at Las Vegas Motor Speedway. Patton drove for the rest of 2004, but the 15th at Vegas would prove to be Patton's best. He also finished all but one of his starts.

In 2006, MB Motorsports announced Patton would drive their No. 63 Ford for a limited schedule, running for Rookie of the Year. Despite four attempts, Patton missed every race he tried to make.

Motorsports career results

NASCAR
(key) (Bold - Pole position awarded by qualifying time. Italics - Pole position earned by points standings or practice time. * – Most laps led.)

Craftsman Truck Series

West Series

ARCA Re/Max Series
(key) (Bold – Pole position awarded by qualifying time. Italics – Pole position earned by points standings or practice time. * – Most laps led.)

References

External links
 

Living people
1983 births
Sportspeople from Las Cruces, New Mexico
Racing drivers from New Mexico
NASCAR drivers
New Mexico State University alumni
Native American sportspeople
World of Outlaws drivers